The American Railroad Company (ARR) owned and operated a railroad in Puerto Rico.

History 

It was reorganized in 1947 as Puerto Rico Railroad & Transport Co. It discontinued passenger service in 1953 and ended all rail operations in 1957.

References 

Rail transport in Puerto Rico
Narrow gauge railroads in Puerto Rico
Narrow gauge railroads in the United States